Saxony is a historical region in Germany and a federal state.

Saxony may also refer to:

Other current German states 
Saxony-Anhalt
Lower Saxony

Historical German states
 Old Saxony (unknown–785), tribal territory of the Saxons
 Duchy of Saxony (804–1296), the settlement area of the Saxons in the late Early Middle Ages
 Electorate of Saxony (1356–1806), a state of the Holy Roman Empire
 Kingdom of Saxony (1806–1918), a state in Germany; successively a member of the Confederation of the Rhine, German Confederation, North German Confederation and German Empire
 Gau Saxony (1926–45), an administrative division of Nazi Germany
 Province of Saxony (1816–1945), a province of the Kingdom of Prussia and later the Free State of Prussia

People 
 Jordan of Saxony, or Jordan von Sachsen

Ships
  (1875)
  (1877), the lead ship of that class
 , a Bayern-class battleship
 , Germany's latest class of highly advanced air-defense frigates
  (F219), the lead ship of that class
, formerly FV Sachsen, a trawler converted to a weather ship during World War II
FV Sachsen, a sealer built in 1938, requisitioned by the Kriegsmarine in 1940 as

Other
 Upper Saxony, name given to German lands held by the House of Wettin in what is now called Central Germany
 Saxony (duck), breed of duck
 Saxony (wine region), the wine region of Saxony
 Saxony Hotel, in Miami Beach, Florida, US
 Saxony Mill, building listed on the National Register of Historic Places in Rockville, Connecticut, US
 Sachsen bei Ansbach, town in the district of Ansbach, Bavaria, Germany
 Saxony yarn, a fine 3-ply yarn spun from the wool of merino sheep
 Saxony (group), a short-lived Australian musical group of the mid-1970s

See also
 Saxon (disambiguation)
 Saxonia (disambiguation)
 Saxons, a confederation of Old Germanic tribes, originally from northern Germany
 History of Saxony
 List of rulers of Saxony
 Saxo Grammaticus
 Saxe (disambiguation)
 13th Mechanized Infantry Division